Juan Daniels (born December 10, 1973) is a former American football wide receiver in the Arena Football League who played for the Nashville Kats. He played college football for the Georgia Bulldogs. He also played in NFL Europe for the Amsterdam Admirals.

References

1973 births
Living people
American football wide receivers
Nashville Kats players
Amsterdam Admirals players
Georgia Bulldogs football players